Rigsby is a village and part of the civil parish of Rigsby with Ailby, in the East Lindsey district of Lincolnshire, England. The origin of the name Rigsby is of, Old Norse-Vikings. Rigsby – Land of Odin, 
Rig (Odin's Nickname) – Old Norse God,
By – Land of.
Similar to many "by"s, Ex: Thorsby, Land of Thor. Visby (Gotland, Sweden) – Land of a Holy place, Hedeby – Land of Heath

Rigsby is listed in the 1086 Domesday Book as "Rigesbi", with 19 households and a church.

The Old church of Rigsby, which was rebuilt in 1863, had a thatched roof. Today the church is a Grade II listed building of limestone dedicated to Saint James, rebuilt in 1863 by James Fowler. It retains a 14th-century octagonal font.

It is ancient woodland lying partly on chalky boulder clay and partly on glacial sands.

References

External links
Rigsby Farming Co Ltd
Rigsby Wold Holiday Cottages

Villages in Lincolnshire
East Lindsey District